The National Alliance is a white supremacist and neo-Nazi political organization founded by William Luther Pierce in 1974 and based in Hillsboro, West Virginia. Membership in 2002 was estimated at 2,500 with an annual income of $1 million. Membership declined after Pierce's death in 2002, and after a split in its ranks in 2005, became largely defunct.

History
The National Alliance was reorganized from an earlier group called the National Youth Alliance (NYA), which in turn was formed out of the remains of the youth wing of Governor George Wallace's 1968 presidential campaign. The NYA broke into factions as a result of infighting, and William Luther Pierce, a former physics associate-professor and author of the white supremacist novels The Turner Diaries and Hunter, gained control of the largest remnant and relaunched it as the National Alliance in 1974. Following Pierce's death from cancer in 2002, the Alliance's board of directors appointed Erich Gliebe to succeed him as chairman of the organization. A series of power struggles began almost immediately, with high-ranking members either resigning or being fired. A boycott of the National Alliance's Resistance Records label resulted in a steep drop-off in generated funds.

In April 2005, prominent Alliance member Kevin Alfred Strom, then editor of National Vanguard magazine, issued a declaration calling for Gliebe to step down; the Alliance's executive committee and most of its unit coordinators supported the action. Gliebe refused, claiming that the Alliance operated under the "Leadership Principle" and stating that he would not yield to any coup. Strom formed a new group called National Vanguard. In January 2008, Strom pleaded guilty to one count of possession of child pornography in exchange for the other charges to be dropped. He was sentenced to 23 months in prison on April 23, 2008. Strom told the court before being sentenced that he was "not a pedophile" and was "in fact the precise opposite of what has been characterized in this case," saying he had been "unwillingly" possessing 10 images of child pornography and that those came from an online forum he had visited which had been "flooded with spam", which included "sleazy, tragic" pictures of children that he deleted. The judge of the case responded: "Mr. Strom, you pled guilty to charges that now you're saying you're innocent. I prefer people plead not guilty than put it on me."

Shortly after the attempted coup by Strom, Gliebe resigned as chairman of the Alliance and briefly appointed Shaun Walker as his successor. However, following Walker's arrest in June 2006, Gliebe again assumed leadership of the organization. By that year, paid membership for the Alliance had declined to fewer than 800 and the paid staff was down to only ten people. By 2012, the Alliance reportedly consisted of fewer than 100 members, with no paid staff other than Gliebe. The following year, it was revealed that the Alliance's property in Mill Point, West Virginia, had been put up for sale. The end of the National Alliance as a "membership organization" was confirmed by Gliebe in September 2013.

Will Williams offshoot

In 2014, Will Williams became head of an organization calling itself the National Alliance (NA). However, a rival faction disputes whether this group maintains continuity with the original Alliance founded by Pierce. The Williams led NA has since been embroiled in several legal issues.

In 2015, an accountant was hired by Williams to audit the NA's books. According to a lawsuit filed by a former Baltimore attorney against the Southern Poverty Law Center (SPLC),  there was a confrontation  between the accountant and Williams. The lawsuit further claims that after the accountant left the NA  headquarters  he  released documents that he had scanned to the SPLC.

In December 2015, Williams was arrested and charged with battery after allegedly hitting and strangling a female employee on the grounds of the Mill Point compound. He was convicted, briefly incarcerated, and placed on probation. He appealed the sentence and the appellate court affirmed the conviction.

Williams was banned from the NA compound in West Virginia pursuant to a court order stemming from his 2015 arrest. Williams claims that the National Alliance "(is) back. We are definitely back". He also said in a letter to a newspaper sent from Laurel Bloomery, Tennessee (allegedly the NA's headquarters) that "(The National Alliance does) not appreciate being called "haters" or being associated with some "hate movement".

Murder of British MP
Thomas Mair, later to be convicted of murdering the British Labour Party politician Jo Cox, was connected to the National Alliance.

Business
Before the death of Pierce, the Southern Poverty Law Center and the Federal Bureau of Investigation called the National Alliance the best-financed and best-organized white nationalist organization of its kind in the United States. Membership in 2002 was estimated at 2,500 with an annual income of $1 million.

In 2004, Harry Robert McCorkill of New Brunswick, Canada, attempted to will his entire estate (valued at almost $250,000) to the National Alliance upon his death. However, in 2014, the Court of Queen's Bench of New Brunswick invalidated the will on the grounds that the National Alliance was a criminal organization made for the purpose of spreading hate speech and inciting violence against non-whites.

Media

Resistance Records
In the past, the organization ran a white power record label called Resistance Records. It released the video game Ethnic Cleansing in 2002, which received criticism from the Anti-Defamation League.

American Dissident Voices
The organization also once had a radio program, American Dissident Voices, which was heard on shortwave, AM and FM stations, and streaming audio on the Internet.  At one point in the mid-1990s there were 22 radio stations, AM and FM, which carried the program. The original host was Kevin Alfred Strom, who continued until early 1997 when Pierce took it over full-time. Upon the death of Pierce in July 2002 it again was hosted until April 16, 2005, by Strom. Walker then became the voice for American Dissident Voices until his arrest in June 2006.  At that time, Gliebe became the voice of the radio program. Broadcasts continued until 2012, when the frequency became erratic. At some time in 2013, Gliebe ceased broadcasting altogether, but programming was resumed by Kevin Alfred Strom in December of that year.

See also
2011 Spokane bombing attempt
List of white nationalist organizations
Nationalist Front
Neo-Nazi groups of the United States
Stormfront (website)
The Order
Algiz
Resistance Records
Vigrid (Norway)

References

External links

Explosion of Hate (report on the National Alliance by the Anti-Defamation League)
A more recent ADL report on the National Alliance
Against the Wall (report on the National Alliance by the Southern Poverty Law Center)
Citizens' Council FBI files obtained through the FOIA and hosted at the Internet Archive

Part 1
Part 2
Part 3
Part 4
Part 5
Part 6
Part 7
Part 8
Part 9
Part 10
Part 11
Part 12
Part 13

Neo-Nazi organizations in the United States
Organizations established in 1974
Organizations disestablished in 2013
1974 establishments in West Virginia
2013 disestablishments in West Virginia